Steve Dansiger is an American drummer and member of the first two incarnations of avant-garde band King Missile and of the band Pianosaurus.

Dansiger is now a therapist and author with a Doctorate in Clinical Psychology. Dansiger has appeared on comedian Marc Maron's WTF podcasts multiple times.

Publications 
• Dansiger, S (2016) Clinical Dharma - A Path for Healers and Helpers. StartAgain Media. 

• Dansiger, S, Marich J (2017) EMDR Therapy and Mindfulness for Trauma-Focused Care. Springer. 

• Dansiger, S, (2019) Mindfulness for Anger Management. Althea Press.

Discography

References

Living people
American rock drummers
King Missile members
Year of birth missing (living people)